To Be Loved Tour was the fifth concert tour by Canadian singer Michael Bublé. Launched in support of his eighth studio album, To Be Loved (2013), the tour began on June 30, 2013, with a series of ten concerts at The O2 Arena in London and ended on March 22, 2015 in Johannesburg.

Opening act
Naturally 7

Setlist
"Fever"
"Haven't Met You Yet"
"Try a Little Tenderness"
"You Make Me Feel So Young" 
"Moondance"  
"Come Dance with Me"
"Feeling Good"
Instrumental (Team Buble)
"I've Got the World on a String"
"Everything"
"That's All"
"Close Your Eyes"
"How Can You Mend a Broken Heart"
"Home"
"Get Lucky"
"Who's Lovin' You" 
"I Want You Back" 
"To Love Somebody" 
"All You Need is Love"
"Burning Love"
"It's a Beautiful Day"
Encore:
"Cry Me a River"
"Save the Last Dance for Me"
"A Song for You"

Tour dates

Notes

References

2013 concert tours
2014 concert tours
2015 concert tours
Michael Bublé concert tours